Daniel Hope (born 17 August 1973, Durban, South Africa) is a European classical violinist.

Early life and education 
Hope was born in Durban, South Africa, and is of Irish and Jewish German descent, his maternal grandparents, formerly from Berlin, having escaped Nazism. His father is the novelist Christopher Hope, FRSL, and his mother Eleanor Hope worked as an assistant to Yehudi Menuhin. At age six months, his family moved from South Africa to London, because of his father's anti-apartheid views. In the UK Hope was educated at Highgate School and studied at the Yehudi Menuhin School in Stoke d'Abernon. In 2011 he was appointed Visiting Professor in Violin by the Royal Academy of Music, where he had studied under Zakhar Bron and gained a diploma (DipRAM) and a fellowship (FRAM).

Career 
Hope became the violinist of the Beaux Arts Trio in 2002. His burgeoning career led to his decision to leave the Beaux Arts Trio, which in turn led to the decision to disband the ensemble. The Beaux Arts Trio, with Hope as the final violinist in the history of the ensemble, gave its final concerts in August 2008.

Hope has served as an associate artistic director of the Savannah Music Festival. In April 2015 he was named the new music director of the Zurich Chamber Orchestra, effective in 2016. On 16 March 2018, at the conclusion of a joint performance by the Zurich Chamber Orchestra and New Century Chamber Orchestra at which he served as concertmaster, Hope was announced as the latter ensemble's new music and artistic director.

In 2017 he was awarded the Cross of the Order of Merit of the Federal Republic of Germany for his merits in the musical constitution of commemorative culture.

Hope plays the 1737 Guarneri "ex-Lipinski" violin.

As a presenter 
Daniel Hope presented the 2013 documentary film The Secrets of the Violin, which explored the history of violin making from Amati, Stradivari and Guarneri to modern makers like Samuel Zygmuntowicz.

Hope@Home (2020) 
In March 2020, in response to the COVID-19 pandemic, Hope began a series of over 100 live concerts broadcast on Arte. These broadcasts under the title "Hope@Home" reached an audience of millions, and earned an OPUS KLASSIK award, Sonderpreis der Jury für besondere Leistungen. The project began as house concerts filmed at his home in Berlin. Appearing with him were artists, often well known, who were also living in the city.

Hope@Home on Tour 
With the easing of lockdown in the summer of 2020, it became possible to move the concerts out of Hope's home to other locations ("Hope@Home on Tour") before the series came to a temporary halt.

Hope@Home Next Generation 
In November, as social distancing tightened across Europe with the second wave of the pandemic, the series resumed in Hope's living-room, this time with a focus on young performers, as "Hope@Home Next Generation". In mid-November the Hope@Home team travelled to San Francisco where Hope worked with the New Century Chamber Orchestra and other artists. Returning to Berlin, the series continued into December 2020.

Christmas concert
In December 2021 and 2022, special Christmas concerts were streamed on the ARTE Concert channel.

Personal life 
Hope is in his second marriage to the painter Silvana Kaiser. The couple lived in Vienna and moved to Berlin in 2016. He holds Irish and German nationality.

Discography 
In 2020 Hope released a disc of highlights from the Hope@Home broadcasts and a Christmas compilation.
He has recorded commercially for Deutsche Grammophon since 2007.

Awards for recordings 
Hope has been recognised in the Echo Klassik awards (often stylized as ECHO Klassik, this was Germany's major classical music award until its renaming in 2018) and its successor award Opus Klassik.

2004: ECHO Klassik: Newcomer of the Year (Violin Concertos – Alban Berg, Benjamin Britten)
2006: ECHO Klassik: Chamber Music Recording of the Year (East Meets West)
2006: ECHO Klassik: Musician of the Year (Dmitri Shostakovich, Violin Concertos 1 & 2)
2008: ECHO Klassik: Concert Recording of the Year (Mendelssohn (with Chamber Orchestra of Europe, conductor Thomas Hengelbrock))
2009: ECHO Klassik: Concert Recording of the year (Vivaldi)
2013: ECHO Klassik: Classic without Borders (Recomposed by Max Richter)
2017: ECHO Klassik: Classic without Borders (For Seasons)
2021: Opus Klassik: Special award

References

External links

Daniel Hope official website
Daniel Hope's biography, Deutsche Grammophon

Living people
1973 births
Irish classical violinists
Irish male violinists
Irish people of German-Jewish descent
Jewish classical violinists
Musicians from Durban
People educated at Highgate School
People educated at Yehudi Menuhin School
Fellows of the Royal Academy of Music
Academics of the Royal Academy of Music
Recipients of the Cross of the Order of Merit of the Federal Republic of Germany
21st-century classical violinists
21st-century Irish male musicians
Beaux Arts Trio members
Male classical violinists